Robert Doyle Marshall Jr. (born October 17, 1960) is an American film and theater director, producer, and choreographer. He is best known for directing the film version of the Broadway musical Chicago, which is itself based on the play of the same name by playwright Maurine Dallas Watkins. His work on the film  earned him the Directors Guild of America Award for Outstanding Directing – Feature Film, as well as nominations for the Academy Award for Best Director, the Golden Globe Award for Best Director, and the BAFTA Award for Best Direction.

Early life and education
Robert Doyle Marshall Jr. was born in Madison, Wisconsin. His father and namesake, Robert Doyle Marshall Sr., was a Ph.D. student at the University of Wisconsin–Madison, and his mother Anne was a teacher. Like him, his younger sister Kathleen became a choreographer and director.

In 1964, Robert Marshall joined the English department at the University of Pittsburgh, and the Marshall family relocated to Pittsburgh. Anne would later work for Pittsburgh Public Schools and the University of Pittsburgh School of Education, and Robert would become associate professor of English and dean of the College of Arts and Sciences at the same university.

Rob Marshall graduated from the Falk School, and then in 1978 from Taylor Allderdice High School, into whose alumni hall of fame he later was inducted. Graduating from Carnegie Mellon University in 1982, Marshall worked in the Pittsburgh theatre scene, performing with such companies as Pittsburgh Civic Light Opera.

Career
Marshall went on to perform as a dancer in various Broadway shows, but suffered a herniated disc while performing in Cats and after recovering, transitioned into choreography and then directing.

He debuted in the film industry with the TV adaptation of the musical Annie by Charles Strouse and Martin Charnin. He went on to direct the 2002 adaptation of the Kander and Ebb musical Chicago, for which he was nominated for an Academy Award for Best Director. His next feature film was the drama Memoirs of a Geisha based on the best-selling book of the same name by Arthur Golden starring Zhang Ziyi, Gong Li, Michelle Yeoh and Ken Watanabe. The film went on to win three Academy Awards and gross $162.2 million at the worldwide box office.

Marshall went on to direct the 2009 film Nine, an adaptation of the Broadway production with the same name starring Daniel Day-Lewis, Marion Cotillard, Nicole Kidman, Sophia Loren and Penélope Cruz, who was nominated for an Academy Award for Best Supporting Actress. On August 2009, it was reported that Marshall was to direct Pirates of the Caribbean: On Stranger Tides, the fourth chapter of Disney's Pirates of the Caribbean film series starring Johnny Depp, Penélope Cruz, Ian McShane and Geoffrey Rush, which opened on May 20, 2011 and grossed $1 billion worldwide.

After working with Disney on Pirates, Marshall directed Disney's film adaptation of Stephen Sondheim's Into the Woods (2014), and produced the film under his Lucamar Productions banner. His next film was the sequel to the 1964 film Mary Poppins, titled Mary Poppins Returns, reuniting two Into the Woods actresses: Emily Blunt as the title character and Meryl Streep in a supporting role.

By December 2017, Disney was considering Marshall to direct the live-action/CGI adaptation of The Little Mermaid, which he was officially confirmed to direct in December 2018.

Personal life
As of at least 2007, Marshall lives in New York City with his partner, producer John DeLuca. In 2004, they bought a $4.2 million summer home in Sagaponack, New York, part of The Hamptons.

Filmography

Film

Television

TV movies

Awards and nominations

List of Tony Award nominations

See also
 LGBT culture in New York City
 List of LGBT people from New York City

References

External links

 
 
 
 

1960 births
American theatre directors
Artists from Madison, Wisconsin
Artists from Pittsburgh
Carnegie Mellon University College of Fine Arts alumni
CAS Filmmaker Award honorees
Directors Guild of America Award winners
Fantasy film directors
Film directors from Pennsylvania
Film directors from Wisconsin
American gay men
Helpmann Award winners
LGBT people from Wisconsin
LGBT theatre directors
Living people
People from Sagaponack, New York
Primetime Emmy Award winners
Taylor Allderdice High School alumni